EchoStar III is a communications satellite operated by EchoStar. Launched in 1997 it was operated in geostationary orbit at a longitude of 61.5 degrees west for 12 years.

Current status 
EchoStar announced August 2, 2017, EchoStar III "experienced an anomaly of unknown origin" during a relocation maneuver in the previous week "that has caused communications with the satellite to be interrupted and intermittent." EchoStar III is now drifting westward at about 0.1 degrees per day, encountering other geostationary satellites. Echostar also said the satellite "is [now] a fully depreciated, non-revenue generating asset."

Satellite 
The launch of EchoStar I made use of an Atlas-II AS rocket flying from Launch Complex 36 at the Cape Canaveral Air Force Station, Florida. The launch took place at 21:01 UTC on October 5, 1997, with the spacecraft entering a geosynchronous transfer orbit. EchoStar III carried 16 (or more) Ku band transponders to provide direct voice and video communications to small dishes in North America after parking over 79 W or 135 W longitude.

Specifications 
 Launch mass: 
 Power: 2 deployable solar arrays, batteries
 Stabilization: 3-axis
 Propulsion: LEROS-1C
 Longitude: 61.5° west

See also

 1997 in spaceflight

References

Spacecraft launched in 1997
Communications satellites in geostationary orbit
Satellites using the A2100 bus
E03